Geraldo Reis Fleming (25 July 1929 – 13 June 1991) was a Brazilian military officer and politician.

References 

1929 births
1991 deaths
People from Campanha
Fluminense Federal University alumni
Brazilian Democratic Movement politicians
Brazilian Labour Party (historical) politicians
Members of the Chamber of Deputies (Brazil) from Acre
Members of the Legislative Assembly of Acre